Jasper Delos Ward (February 1, 1829 – August 6, 1902) was a U.S. Representative from Illinois.  He is also the great great grandfather of Congressman Mike Ward (American politician), D-KY 3 (Louisville), 1995-1997.

Born in Java, Wyoming County, New York, Ward attended Allegheny College, Meadville, Pennsylvania, in 1849 and 1850. He studied law. He was admitted to the bar in 1852 and commenced practice in Chicago, Illinois. He served as a member of the board of aldermen of Chicago in 1855, 1856, 1859, and 1860. During the American Civil War he enlisted in the Western Engineer Regiment in 1861 and served for about eight months. He served as a member of the Illinois Senate 1862-1870.

Ward was elected as a Republican to the Forty-third Congress (March 4, 1873 – March 3, 1875). He was an unsuccessful candidate for reelection in 1874 to the Forty-fourth Congress. He was United States Attorney for the northern district of Illinois 1875-1877. He moved to Colorado in 1877 and settled in Leadville. He was appointed by Governor Frederick Walker Pitkin as judge of the fifth judicial district of Colorado and served from March 5, 1881 to January 3, 1882, declining to be a candidate for election to the same office. He moved to Denver, and resumed the practice of law. He died on August 6, 1902 and was interred in Fairmount Cemetery in Denver.

References

External links

1829 births
1902 deaths
Republican Party Illinois state senators
Chicago City Council members
Union Army personnel
Republican Party members of the United States House of Representatives from Illinois
United States Attorneys for the Northern District of Illinois
19th-century American politicians
People from Wyoming County, New York
People from Leadville, Colorado